"Pour la Serbie" (For Serbia) is the title of a speech written by Victor Hugo, on 29 August 1876, castigating massacres perpetrated by the Turks in Serbia. It was first published as an open letter in the French newspaper Le Rappel, later included in the last volume of Actes et Paroles, Hugo's collected political writings, entitled .

Content
During 1876, the Ottoman harsh suppression of the uprisings of Balkan Christians, specifically, the atrocities in Bulgaria, had been witnessed by Western observers and fully reported in the European press with gruesome details. The Turks had very few regular troops and therefore used irregular Bashi-bazouks who used methods of the utmost violence. When the full extent of the massacres became known, a very strong public reaction against the Ottoman Empire occurred. In this text, Hugo delivers a plea protesting against the impassivity of European governments, in particular in the face of the massacre committed by the Turks in Serbia.

Hugo's eloquent appeal is calling European governments to take action, and people to raise their voices in universal indignation. This speech is considered as one of the founding acts of the European idea.

See also
 Serbian–Turkish Wars (1876–1878)
 Le Rappel

References

Further reading

External links 

 For the speech in full, see: Pour la Serbie (in French),  Za Srbiju (in Serbian).

Works by Victor Hugo
1876 speeches
1876 in politics
August 1876 events
Serbian–Turkish Wars (1876–1878)
1876 in the Ottoman Empire